Between Nothingness & Eternity is the first live album by jazz fusion band Mahavishnu Orchestra, released on November 1973 by Columbia Records. According to the Mahavishnu Orchestra Gigs listing by Walter Kolosky, it was recorded live at the Schaefer Music Festival, held in Central Park, New York, on August 17 and 18, 1973, even though available recordings indicate that all of the material from the album was taken from the second night only. Originally, Mahavishnu Orchestra's third album was to be a studio effort, recorded in June 1973 at Trident in London, but was scrapped during the final days of the project; the live album, containing versions of three of the original six tracks, was released instead as the last album during the period of the original line-up of the band. The original studio album was released in 1999 as The Lost Trident Sessions.

Between Nothingness & Eternity was included in 2011 as part of The Complete Columbia Albums Collection boxed set, along with the other albums by the first line-up of the band, including The Lost Trident Sessions. This new version was a new different mix with an additional minute of music on "Sister Andrea". The boxed set also contained an album called Unreleased Tracks from Between Nothingness & Eternity, which contains other selections from the two Central Park shows.

Track listing

Original vinyl

"The Complete Columbia Albums Collection" version

Personnel 
John McLaughlin - guitar
Jan Hammer - keyboards
Jerry Goodman - violin
Rick Laird - bass
Billy Cobham - percussion

Charts

References

Mahavishnu Orchestra albums
1973 live albums
Columbia Records live albums
Albums recorded at Central Park
Live jazz fusion albums